Robert Skibniewski (born 19 July 1983) is a Polish professional basketball player for GTK Gliwice of the Polish League. He is a 182 cm (6 ft 0 in) tall point guard.

Professional career
Skibniewski was the Polish Cup MVP, in 2011.

National team career 
Skibniewski played with the senior Polish national team at the 2007 EuroBasket, the 2009 EuroBasket, and the 2011 EuroBasket. He also made the squad for the 2015 EuroBasket, replacing Dardan Berisha.

References

External links 
 PLK profile 

1983 births
Living people
AZS Koszalin players
KK Włocławek players
People from Bielawa
Point guards
Polish men's basketball players
Polish expatriates in the Czech Republic
Śląsk Wrocław basketball players
Turów Zgorzelec players